Hossein Gol-e-Golâb (Persian حسین گل‌گلاب  also given as Hosayn Golgolâb, (1895 – March 13, 1985) was a polymath Iranian scholar and musician who wrote the patriotic anthem “Ey Irân”.

Gol-e-Golâb was born in Tehran, and studied at the Elmiya School and Dar-ul-Funun university,   

Gol-e-Golâb never lost his interest in music, finding time to translate Western operas into his native Persian while teaching and writing on botany and serving on the Academy of Persian Language and Literature, to which he was appointed 1935.

External links
Gol-e-Golab bio & history of Ey Iran
Hossein Golgolab' biography on RKAC
Gol-e Golāb, Ḥosayn - Iranica Online
Gol-golāb, Ḥosayn - Iranica Online

References

1895 births
1984 deaths
Iranian botanists
20th-century Iranian musicians
Iranian translators
Scientists from Tehran
20th-century translators